Gorzyczki may refer to the following places in Poland:
Gorzyczki, Greater Poland Voivodeship (west-central Poland)
Gorzyczki, Silesian Voivodeship (south Poland)